Term carboxypeptidase D may refer to:
 Carboxypeptidase, a generic enzyme class
 Carboxypeptidase D, the EC 3.4.16.6 enzyme class
 Metallocarboxypeptidase D, the EC 3.4.17.22 enzyme class